Lenny Jean-Pierre Pintor (born 5 August 2000) is a French professional footballer who plays as a forward for  club Saint-Étienne.

Club career
On 22 August 2017, Pintor signed his first professional contract with Brest for three years, joining from Bastia. Pintor made his professional debut for Brest on 15 December 2017 in a 4–1 Ligue 2 win over Quevilly-Rouen, at the age of 17.

On 31 August 2018, the last day of the 2018 summer transfer window, Pintor joined Ligue 1 side Lyon on a five-year contract. Brest received transfer fee of €5 million plus €4 million in bonuses and a percentage on resale.

Pintor scored on his Youth League debut in an away victory against Manchester City. He also scored in his second Youth League game against Shaktar Donetsk. He made his first full Lyon debut on 19 October 2018, replacing Memphis Depay during the injury time of a 2–0 win against Nîmes.

On 4 August 2022, Pintor joined Lyon's rival Saint-Étienne on a two-year contract. Although he joined the club for free, Lyon will receive 30% of a future transfer fee.

International career
Pintor represented France at the 2017 FIFA U-17 World Cup, and scored in the round of 16 loss to the Spain U17s on 17 October 2017.

Personal life
Born in metropolitan France, Pintor is of Martiniquais descent.

References

External links

 
 
 SB29 Profile
 
 

2000 births
Living people
People from Sarcelles
Footballers from Val-d'Oise
French footballers
French people of Martiniquais descent
France youth international footballers
Association football forwards
SC Bastia players
Stade Brestois 29 players
Olympique Lyonnais players
ES Troyes AC players
AS Saint-Étienne players
Ligue 1 players
Ligue 2 players